John James Brennan (28 November 1887 – 11 October 1943) was a famous Irish sportsperson who played hurling with Kilkenny.  In a senior inter-county career that lasted from 1905 until 1914 he won four All-Ireland titles and four Leinster titles.
He also was successful in playing rugby, winning the Leinster Junior Cup with Kilkenny in 1920.

He played during Kilkenny’s greatest era 1904 to 1913. He played in the All-Ireland Senior Hurling Championship in  1905, 1911, 1912, 1913.

He was a doctor who worked in Kilkenny, as a ship's surgeon with the Cunard Line on the Mauretania and later in London before returning to Kilkenny where he died in 1944.

External links
 Kilkenny GAA Bible 2008 

1887 births
1943 deaths
Kilkenny inter-county hurlers
All-Ireland Senior Hurling Championship winners